Grambow is a municipality in the Nordwestmecklenburg district, in Mecklenburg-Vorpommern, Germany.

It is close to the cities of Lübeck, Wismar and Schwerin and is part of the Hamburg Metropolitan Region.

References

Nordwestmecklenburg